"Escape from L.A." is the eleventh episode of the second season of American animated television series BoJack Horseman. It was written by Joe Lawson and directed by Amy Winfrey. The episode was released in the United States, along with the rest of season two, via Netflix on July 17, 2015. Olivia Wilde, Ed Helms, Adam Pally, and Ilana Glazer provide guest voices.

In the episode, BoJack visits his old friend Charlotte Moore in hopes of starting a relationship with her, only to find out she already has a family. He begins to bond with the family anyway, ultimately leading to disastrous results.

Plot 
BoJack (Voiced by Will Arnett) arrives in Tesuque, New Mexico, to surprise visit his younger days friend Charlotte (Olivia Wilde), with whom he reckons he can live happily ever after. To his shock, Charlotte is married and has two teenage children. BoJack awkwardly makes up that he is in New Mexico to buy a boat. After he actually does buy a yacht, which he calls Escape from L.A., Charlotte convinces him to stay a few days since everybody there loves him. BoJack receives a call from Princess Carolyn (Amy Sedaris) urging him to get back to the Secretariat film set, but he ignores her. Two months later, BoJack is still in New Mexico. He has become a member of the family and sleeps in his yacht, which is parked in the driveway.

Penny (Ilana Glazer), Charlotte's 17-year-old daughter, is upset that her love interest Diego Mendoza rejected her invitation to prom. BoJack suggests that he should go as her surrogate date in order to spite Diego. They go to prom on a double date with Penny's friends Maddy (Ali Wong) and her boyfriend Pete (Jermaine Fowler). BoJack supplies the group with bourbon whiskey on the way there. At prom, Maddy gets increasingly drunk; Penny is sad over seeing Diego with his date; and BoJack gets booed off the dancefloor after trying to dance to his 90's hit song "Do the BoJack". They decide to leave the party, driving out to the desert. There, Maddy passes out. Fearing that she might have alcohol poisoning, they rush her to the hospital. BoJack abandons Maddy and Pete at the hospital to avoid being held responsible, and he and Penny drive home.

At home, Penny says that she had fun after all, and makes a pass at BoJack. He rejects her, telling her that she is too young and does not know what she really wants. She cries and goes inside, while BoJack goes to the backyard, where Charlotte is sitting at the fire pit. BoJack says he does not know what to do with his life, and Charlotte tries to comfort him. They kiss in the heat of the moment, but Charlotte quickly realizes that it was a mistake. BoJack, on the other side, urges Charlotte to leave with him and, after she dismisses the idea, he begs her to forget about it so that they can live on as if nothing had happened. Charlotte once again refuses, and tells BoJack that he should leave in the morning.

Defeated, BoJack goes to his yacht, where once again Penny propositions to him. He tells her to go to bed, but leaves the door open as he gets inside the yacht. Charlotte hears voices inside the yacht and, as she opens the door, she finds Penny and BoJack in a compromising position. Charlotte sends Penny to her room and warns BoJack to leave immediately and never try to contact them again.

BoJack has his boat driven to Los Angeles, where he encounters his house in the same miserable conditions he had left it in. On the balcony, he finds a depressed Diane (Alison Brie) still squatting at his house.

Significance 
Like every second-to-last episode of a BoJack Horseman season, "Escape from L.A." is particularly significant, and leaves the title character in a difficult place. BoJack ends the episode at a low point, as his time in New Mexico proves to be a major source of remorse that will haunt him for the rest of the series. In "Start Spreading the News" (S3E01), he partly confesses what happened in New Mexico to a journalist. This confession, recorded without BoJack noticing, is then played to Diane in season 5, which leads to the deterioration of their friendship. In "That's Too Much, Man!" (S3E11) BoJack travels to Oberlin, Ohio with Sarah Lynn, trying to make amends to Penny. He fails to do so, reopening Penny's wounds instead. In the same episode, BoJack gives Penny's complete name at an AA meeting; in season 6, this will lead journalists Paige Sinclair and Maximilian Banks to Penny while investigating Sarah Lynn's death. In "A Quick One, While He's Away" (S6E08), BoJack's half-sister Hollyhock meets Pete Repeat at a party. He describes his recollection of the events on prom night, mentioning Maddy's alcohol poisoning and describing BoJack as "some shitty dude". This proves to be a major setback in BoJack's relationship with Hollyhock.

Reception 
"Escape from L.A." received critical acclaim. Caroline Framke of The A.V. Club gave the episode an "A" grade, describing it as a series standout, and as a risky and "unequivocal condemnation of its main character". In Paste, Julie Kliegman gives the episode a 9.3 rating, saying that "BoJack's lovable loser status is gone, probably for good. Some mistakes are too big to laugh off."
Likewise, YouTuber Johnny 2 Cellos describes it as "a huge crossroads for the audience, forcing us to really examine BoJack's actions and ask if this is a character that we can like and root for moving forward", while praising its structure that subverts sitcom tropes.

References

External links 
 "Escape from L.A." on Netflix
 

BoJack Horseman episodes
2015 American television episodes